Ray Kimble (born April 19, 1953) is an American track and field athlete and former collegiate football player for Washington State University.  His primary event is the triple jump.  He is the current M40 world record holder.  His M45 best is 47 cm superior to the listed world record, but has never been ratified.

"Fourth place" describes his attempts to reach the Olympics and World Championships, as that was the place he finished twice at the U.S. Olympic Trials, 1984 and 1992.  In the 1984 he was beaten by the future gold medalist Al Joyner, silver medalist and 1992 gold medalist Mike Conley, Sr. and future world record holder Willie Banks, in 1992 it was Conley again and silver medalist Charles Simpkins (who he had beaten in 1984).  He also finished seventh in 1988.  Only the top three go to the Olympics.  He suffered the same fate at the 1983 USA Outdoor Track and Field Championships, the qualifier for the first World Championships in Athletics, beaten by the same three competitors as in 1984.  He did represent the United States internationally at the 1991 Pan American Games, where he finished fourth.  By that time he was already 38 years old.  He continued jumping in top level competition against competitors young enough to be his children well into his 40s. Held Masters World Triple Jump Record M35 & M40.

After growing up in California, Kimble went to high school in Texarkana, Arkansas. He was a starting wide receiver and occasional defensive back at Washington State, graduating in 1976. There he used jumping on the track team as an excuse to avoid spring training with the football team. He retired from jumping after college and took a job teaching physical education at Barnard White Middle School in Union City, California. He returned to jumping in 1980. More frustration, his personal best was a wind aided , which if it had been legal would still rank #33 on the world all time list. At the time it would have been in the all time top ten.

References

1953 births
Living people
American male triple jumpers
Washington State Cougars football players
Athletes (track and field) at the 1991 Pan American Games
Sportspeople from Hayward, California
Track and field athletes from California
American masters athletes
World record holders in masters athletics
Pan American Games track and field athletes for the United States